The Proclamation of Independence Memorial is a museum in Melaka City, Melaka, Malaysia.

History
The memorial building was established in 1912. The building used to house the Malacca Club which was used as the social centre of the British people in British Malaya. The memorial was set up and officiated by former Prime Minister Tunku Abdul Rahman on 31 August 1985, 28 years after the independence of the country.

Architecture
The museum is housed in an elegant Dutch colonial mansion. The two golden onion domes located at the top of the building embellish the stark white stucco.

Exhibitions
The memorial exhibits records and photos of the early era of Malay Sultanate. It also displays the journey of Malaysia from independence and its modern development.

See also
 List of museums in Malaysia
 List of tourist attractions in Melaka

References

1985 establishments in Malaysia
Buildings and structures completed in 1912
Buildings and structures in Malacca City
20th-century architecture in Malaysia